Dolno Konjare is a village in the municipality of Kumanovo, North Macedonia.

Demographics
According to the statistics of Bulgarian ethnographer Vasil Kanchov from 1900 the settlement is recorded as "Kojnare Dolno" as having 56 inhabitants, all Bulgarian Exarchists. 

According to the 2002 census, the village had a total of 1286 inhabitants. Ethnic groups in the village include:

Macedonians 669
Serbs 516
Albanians 91
Romani 2
Others 8

References

External links

Villages in Kumanovo Municipality